The white-throated robin-chat or white-throated robin (Cossypha humeralis) is a species of bird in the family Muscicapidae. It is endemic to Botswana, Eswatini, Mozambique, South Africa, and Zimbabwe. Its natural habitats are dry savannah and subtropical or tropical dry shrubland.

Habitat
The white-throated robin-chat is found in dry savannah woodland and shrubland.

Behaviour
The white-throated robin-chat is mainly insectivorous but also eats small vertebrates and some plant material. Its diet includes beetles, termites, ants, crickets, caterpillars, bugs, spiders and millipedes. It also consumes the fruits of the woolly caper-bush (Capparis tomentosa), the tassel-berry (Antidesma venosum), the sand raisin (Grewia microthyrsa), the magic guarrie (Euclea divinorum) and the dune guarrie (Euclea racemosa).

Breeding

Breeding takes place in the spring, principally in October and November. The nest is usually on or near the ground, in a hollow stump, near the root of a vine or in a discarded utensil. It is cup-shaped and composed of twigs, dry grasses and leaves and lined with rootlets, tendrils, stalks and fragments of leaves. There are usually two or three eggs and the incubation is done solely by the hen bird and lasts fourteen to fifteen days. Both parents feed the chicks, which leave the nest after about a fortnight but remain dependent on the adults for another six or seven weeks. The white-throated robin-chat is sometimes parasitised by the red-chested cuckoo.

Status
The white-throated robin-chat is found in southern Africa. Its population has not been quantified but it is common in much of its range and the population appears to be stable, so the IUCN lists it as being of "Least Concern".

References

External links
 White-throated robin-chat - Species text in The Atlas of Southern African Birds.

white-throated robin-chat
Birds of Southern Africa
white-throated robin-chat
Taxonomy articles created by Polbot
Taxobox binomials not recognized by IUCN